"Real Life (I Never Was the Same Again)" is a song written by Neil Thrasher and Jim Janosky, and recorded by American country music artist Jeff Carson.  It released in May 2001 as the third single from his third album, Real Life.  The song was written by Neil Thrasher and Jim Janosky. It was nominated for Song of the Year at the 2001 Christian Country Music Awards.

Music video
The music video was directed by David Abbott and premiered in September 2001.

Chart performance
"Real Life (I Never Was the Same Again)" debuted at number 54 on the U.S. Billboard Hot Country Singles & Tracks chart for the week of May 26, 2001.

Year-end charts

References

2001 singles
2001 songs
Jeff Carson songs
Curb Records singles
Songs written by Neil Thrasher